Power Rangers Mystic Force is the fourteenth season of the television series Power Rangers, based on the Japanese 29th Super Sentai tokusatsu series. The season premiered on February 20, 2006 as part of the Jetix block on Toon Disney. The season is an adaptation of Mahō Sentai Magiranger, and is the only Disney-produced season to feature the main villain from its Super Sentai counterpart.

Plot
Twenty years ago in a magic-filled dimension, the forces of darkness came into power and a war called the "Great Battle" between good and evil began all while the citizens of the human world remained unaware. An army of monsters, led by a magnificent warrior named Morticon, swarmed the land with their sights set on taking over the magical realm, the human realm, and beyond. The army of Morticon, opposed by five wizards, the most powerful wizard of all Leanbow, cast a spell to pushed back the dark forces and closes the walls of the underworld forever. The Gatekeeper sealed the gates for all eternity. The army of Light successfully thwarted the dark forces' attempt to take the surface world, but the five wizards lost their lives. Leanbow, who sealed himself on their side of the Gate to make sure evil sources do not escape, journeyed to the underworld.

In the present day, the city of Briarwood is struck by an earthquake, which proves powerful enough to crack the seal and allow evil to renew its attempt to invade the Earth. The sorceress Udonna, alerted to their return, seeks out the warriors of legend, Briarwood teenagers Nick, Chip, Xander, and sisters Madison and Vida, to become the Power Rangers alongside her. While Nick is reluctant at first, he realizes his destiny and joins the others in the fight against the Master of the Underworld and his numerous minions. When Udonna briefly loses her Ranger powers to the mysterious Koragg, it is up to the team to save the Earth on their own. They are assisted by Udonna's bumbling apprentice, Clare, and eventually Jenji the Genie Cat and his master Daggeron, the Solaris Knight.

Using their powerful magic and incredible martial arts skills, the Mystic Force Rangers must rely on teamwork to save the day. Later, in a shocking surprise, it is revealed that Koragg is none other than Leanbow, the greatest and the strongest of the five original wizards. In a fight with Udonna, Koragg takes over Udonna's magical staff filled with the power of goodness. Over time, Udonna's magical staff, along with the knowledge that Nick is actually his and Udonna's missing son Bowen, helps Koragg turn back to his original self, allowing him to use his powers to transform into the Wolf Warrior. In the end, the Rangers come together to defeat the Master of the Underworld with the help of Briarwood's people with the power of truth and goodness. With the forces of darkness defeated, Nick, Udonna, and Leanbow leave Briarwood to meet Nick's adoptive parents while the remaining Rangers stay behind to protect their home.

Cast and characters
Mystic Force Rangers

 Firass Dirani as Bowen / Nicolas "Nick" Russell, the Red Mystic Ranger
 Nic Sampson as Charlie "Chip" Thorn, the Yellow Mystic Ranger
 Melanie Vallejo as Madison "Maddie" Rocca, the Blue Mystic Ranger
 Angie Diaz as Vida "V" Rocca, the Pink Mystic Ranger
 Richard Brancatisano as Xander Bly, the Green Mystic Ranger
 John Tui as Daggeron, the Solaris Knight
 Peta Rutter as Udonna, the White Mystic Ranger
 Chris Graham as Leanbow, the Wolf Warrior

Supporting characters
 Antonia Prebble as Clare Langtree
 Barnie Duncan as Toby Slambrook
 Kelson Henderson as Phineas
 Paolo Rotondo as the voice of the Snow Prince
 Oliver Driver as the voice of Jenji
 Holly Shanahan as Leelee Pimvare
 Brigitte Berger as Nikki Pimvare

Villains
 Andrew Robertt as the voice of Morticon
 Stuart Devenie as the voice of Imperious
 Geoff Dolan as the voice of Koragg
 Donogh Rees as the voice of Necrolai
 John Leigh as Octomus
 Greg Smith as the voice of Magma
 Andrew Laing as the voice of Oculous
 Sally Stockwell as the voice of Serpentina
 Dallas Barnett as the voice of Megahorn
 Charlie McDermott as the voice of Hekatoid
 Mark Ferguson as the voice of Gekkor
 Cameron Rhodes as the voice of Matoombo
 Josephine Davison as the voice of Itassis
 Derek Judge as the voice of Black Lance
 Peter Daube as the voice of Sculpin

Episodes

Comics
Characters have been featured in Power Rangers comics published by Boom! Studios.

In 2018, the Mystic Force Rangers appeared in "Shattered Grid", a crossover event between teams from all eras commemorating the 25th anniversary of the original television series. It was published in Mighty Morphin Power Rangers #25-30 and various tie-ins.

A Power Rangers Mystic Force story by Magdalene Visaggio and French Carlomagno was published the same year in Mighty Morphin Power Rangers 25th Anniversary Special #1.

Notes

External links

 Official Power Rangers Website
 

 
Mystic Force
2000s American horror television series
2000s American science fiction television series
2000s American supernatural television series
2006 American television series debuts
2006 American television series endings
American Broadcasting Company original programming
American children's action television series
American children's adventure television series
American children's fantasy television series
English-language television shows
Jinn in popular culture
Vampires in television
Television series about size change
Television series about siblings
Television series about teenagers
Television series by Disney
Television shows filmed in New Zealand
Genies in television
Television about magic